Phillips Chalier Valdéz (born November 16, 1991) is a Dominican professional baseball pitcher in the Colorado Rockies organization. He has previously played in Major League Baseball (MLB) for the Texas Rangers and Boston Red Sox.

Career

Cleveland Indians
Valdéz signed as an international free agent with the Cleveland Indians on May 29, 2009. He played for the DSL Indians in 2009 and 2010. On November 10, 2010, he was released by Cleveland.

Washington Nationals
On December 16, 2010, he signed a minor league contract with the Tampa Bay Rays, but was released on May 1, 2011, and did not appear in a professional game in 2011. Valdéz trained at a Japanese baseball academy in the Dominican that year after being released. On May 30, 2012, he signed a minor league contract with the Washington Nationals. From 2012 through the 2018 season, he played in the Washington organization. During his time with them, he played for the DSL Nationals, Gulf Coast Nationals, Auburn Doubledays, Hagerstown Suns, Potomac Nationals, Harrisburg Senators, and the Syracuse Chiefs.

Texas Rangers
Valdéz elected free agency after the 2018 season and on December 21, 2018, he signed a minor league contract with the Texas Rangers. He was assigned to the Nashville Sounds to open the 2019 season. With Nashville in 2019, he went 1–7 with a 4.92 ERA over  innings.

On June 8, Valdéz had his contract selected and he was called up to the major leagues for the first time, as the 26th man of a doubleheader versus the Oakland Athletics. He made his debut that afternoon, throwing two scoreless innings in relief. With Texas in 2019, Valdéz went 0–0 with a 3.94 ERA and 18 strikeouts over 16 innings. On November 1, 2019, Valdéz was claimed off waivers by the Seattle Mariners.

Boston Red Sox
On February 23, 2020, Valdéz was claimed off waivers by the Boston Red Sox. He was optioned to the Triple-A Pawtucket Red Sox on March 8. On July 24, Valdéz made his Red Sox debut in the opening game of the delayed-start  season, pitching two scoreless innings of relief in a 13–2 win over the Baltimore Orioles. On August 25, Valdéz pitched  scoreless innings to pick up his first MLB win in a 9–7 victory over the Toronto Blue Jays. Overall with the 2020 Red Sox, Valdéz appeared in 24 games, all in relief, compiling a 1–1 record with 3.26 ERA and 30 strikeouts in  innings pitched.

Valdéz began the 2021 season as a member of Boston's bullpen. On June 6, he recorded his first major league save, coming in extra-innings away game against the New York Yankees after closer Matt Barnes had a blown save in the bottom of the ninth. Valdéz was optioned to the Triple-A Worcester Red Sox on June 10, after pitching three times in four days. He was recalled to Boston on July 23, returned to Worcester on August 12, and again recalled to Boston on August 30. On September 12, Valdéz was placed on the COVID-related list. Overall during the regular season, Valdéz made 28 relief appearances for Boston, pitching to a 2–0 record with 5.85 ERA while striking out 35 batters in 40 innings.

Valdéz began the 2022 season as a member of Boston's bullpen, until being optioned to Worcester on May 2 as MLB rosters contracted from 28 to 26 players. He subsequently split time between Worcester and Boston, being recalled and optioned multiple times. Valdéz was designated for assignment on July 26. In 13 relief appearances with Boston during 2022, he posted a 4.41 ERA and 0–1 record while striking out 13 batters in  innings.

Seattle Mariners
On July 29, 2022, Valdéz was claimed off waivers by the Seattle Mariners and was optioned to the Triple-A Tacoma Rainiers. He was designated for assignment on September 30. He elected free agency on November 10, 2022.

Colorado Rockies
On December 15, 2022, Valdéz signed a minor league contract with the Colorado Rockies.

Personal life

Valdez has a daughter who was born on August 2022 in Boston. Previously married Samantha Gross in Las Vegas, Nevada, July 10, 2017..During 2019 spring training, Valdéz's younger brother Mario died after suffering a heart attack at the age of 18.

References

External links

1991 births
Living people
Sportspeople from San Pedro de Macorís
Dominican Republic expatriate baseball players in the United States
Major League Baseball players from the Dominican Republic
Major League Baseball pitchers
Texas Rangers players
Boston Red Sox players
Dominican Summer League Indians players
Dominican Summer League Nationals players
Gulf Coast Nationals players
Auburn Doubledays players
Hagerstown Suns players
Potomac Nationals players
Harrisburg Senators players
Syracuse Chiefs players
Nashville Sounds players
Estrellas Orientales players
Worcester Red Sox players
Tacoma Rainiers players